King's College was a for-profit college in Charlotte, North Carolina. Founded in 1901, over half of students came from the Charlotte area. There was also on-campus housing for students. King's College awarded both diplomas and Associate's degrees.

The college closed in December 2018 due to low enrollment.

Student body, admissions, and outcomes 

According to Peterson's and recent institutional publications, King's College had 1,024 applicants, of which 801 or 78% were admitted, producing an undergraduate population of 501.  According to College Navigator, the most recent graduation/transfer out rate is 79%.

Academics 

King's College provided career-focused courses to high school graduates.  King's College's programs offered hands-on learning opportunities that prepare graduates to start working immediately. Some programs offered externships as well. Students could earn a diploma in 8–12 months. Associate degree programs could be completed in 16 months.

King's College offered ten major areas of study in three categories: Business, Technology, and Health care.

Accreditation 

King's College was previously accredited by the Accrediting Council for Independent Colleges and Schools to award diplomas and associate degrees. The Medical Assisting Program was accredited by the Commission on Accreditation of Allied Health Education Programs (CAAHEP).

References 

Graphic design schools in the United States
For-profit universities and colleges in the United States
Private universities and colleges in North Carolina
Universities and colleges in Charlotte, North Carolina
1901 establishments in North Carolina
2018 disestablishments in North Carolina
Educational institutions established in 1901
Educational institutions disestablished in 2018